Brigman Owens (February 16, 1943 – June 21, 2022) was an American professional football player who was a safety in the National Football League (NFL) for the Dallas Cowboys and Washington Redskins. He played college football at the University of Cincinnati.

Early years
Owens attended Fullerton Union High School, where he played as a quarterback. After graduation he moved on to Fullerton Junior College, where he was named the starting quarterback and led the team to its first ever bowl game, the 1961 Orange Bowl Show. In his second season, he received junior college All-American honors.

In 1963, he transferred to the University of Cincinnati, where he was named the starting quarterback. He posted 974 passing yards, 7 passing touchdowns, 556 rushing yards (led the team) and 6 rushing touchdowns (led the team), while ranking twelfth in the nation in total offense. He also served as a placekicker and punter.

In his last year, he led the team to a 10-1 record, which were the most wins in school history. He posted 790 passing yards, 6 passing touchdowns, 658 rushing yards and 6 rushing touchdowns. He was a passer, runner, and punter, finishing his college career with a 16-5 record, 2 Missouri Valley Conference titles, 1,764 passing yards, 13 passing touchdowns, 1,214 rushing yards and 12 rushing touchdowns.

In 1979, he was inducted into the University of Cincinnati Athletics Hall of Fame. In 1982, he was inducted into the Orange County Sports Hall of Fame. In 2005, he was inducted into the Fullerton College Athletics Hall of Fame.

Professional career

Dallas Cowboys
Owens was selected by the Dallas Cowboys in the seventh round (89th overall) of the 1965 NFL Draft and converted to safety. He spent most of the year on the team's taxi squad. On August 30, 1966, he was traded, along with Jake Kupp and Mitch Johnson, to the Washington Redskins for Jim Steffen and a fifth-round draft choice (#119-Willie Parker).

Washington Redskins
In 1970, he was named the starter at strong safety. He remained with the Redskins until he retired after the 1977 season. He played a significant role in leading the 1972 squad to Super Bowl VII and had a good performance in the game, recording a key interception from Miami Dolphins quarterback Bob Griese in the end zone during the second half.

One of his more memorable performances occurred on a 1966 regular season game against the New York Giants, where he scored two defensive touchdowns: a 62-yard interception return and a 62-yard fumble return.  Washington ended up winning the game 72–41.  To this day it is the highest scoring game in NFL history.

Owens holds the record for most interception return yards in Redskins history (686) and is second all-time for the Redskins in career interceptions (36).  Three of his interceptions were returned for touchdowns.  He also recovered ten fumbles, returning them for 143 yards and two touchdowns.

He was inducted into the Redskins' Ring of Fame.

Personal life
After the NFL, Owens earned a law degree at Potomac Law School and went to work with the National Football League Players Association, serving as the assistant executive director. He also owned his own business, a commercial real estate development company which also represented professional athletes.

Owens was a member of Alpha Phi Alpha fraternity. Married to Patricia from 1965 until his death, the couple had two daughters, Robin and Tracy.

Owens died on June 21, 2022, at the age of 79.

References

External links
The 80 Greatest Redskins

1943 births
2022 deaths
African-American players of American football
People from Linden, Texas
Sportspeople from Fullerton, California
Players of American football from California
Players of American football from Texas
American football quarterbacks
American football safeties
Fullerton Hornets football players
Cincinnati Bearcats football players
Dallas Cowboys players
Washington Redskins players